Daniel Gaudet (born August 16, 1959), also known as Dan Gaudet, is a Canadian former artistic gymnast. He was born in Moncton, New Brunswick, raised in Toronto, and educated at Agincourt Collegiate Institute and York University. Gaudet  currently teaches mathematics at the United World College of South East Asia in Singapore. He previously taught at the American British Academy in Muscat. He is married (his wife is a teacher who used to work at the same school), and has two daughters.

Career
Gaudet was a skilled gymnast. He competed for Canada in the 1984 Summer Olympics in Los Angeles, California, in the category of Artistic Gymnastics. He took part in all six events: Floor, Pommel Horse, Rings, Vault, Parallel Bars, High Bar. He placed 9th in Rings. In Individual All-Around, he placed 33rd.

His scores were as below:

Score: 114.600

He was selected to the hall of fame in 2002. At the national finals, Gaudet collected 10 individual medals including three all-round championships. At the OUAA Championships, he collected a total of 21 medals including four all-round titles.

 'A two-time national champion'

References

External links
1984 Olympics Results
UWCSEA website - see staff photos

1959 births
Living people
Canadian academics
Canadian male artistic gymnasts
Gymnasts at the 1984 Summer Olympics
Olympic gymnasts of Canada
Sportspeople from Moncton